Petrovice is a municipality and village in Třebíč District in the Vysočina Region of the Czech Republic. It has about 400 inhabitants.

Notable people
Pavel Padrnos (born 1970), road racing cyclist

References

Villages in Třebíč District